Moon Sung-hye (born November 30, 1978) is a retired South Korean para table tennis player. She won a bronze medal at the 2008 Summer Paralympics and two bronze medals at the 2012 Summer Paralympics.

Moon had a spinal cord injury from an accident in 1997.

Personal life
Moon is married to Chinese para table tennis player Cao Ningning. They met for the first time in 2007, and fell in love in 2011. The couple wed in 2013 and have 3 daughters together.

References 

1978 births
Living people
People with paraplegia
Paralympic medalists in table tennis
South Korean female table tennis players
Medalists at the 2008 Summer Paralympics
Table tennis players at the 2008 Summer Paralympics
Table tennis players at the 2012 Summer Paralympics
Medalists at the 2012 Summer Paralympics
Paralympic bronze medalists for South Korea
Paralympic table tennis players of South Korea
Sportspeople from Daegu
FESPIC Games competitors
21st-century South Korean women